Labeo nunensis is a species of fish in the genus Labeo from Cameroon.

References 

Endemic fauna of Cameroon
Labeo
Taxa named by Jacques Pellegrin
Fish described in 1929